Doggejávri is a lake in Hammerfest Municipality in Troms og Finnmark county, Norway.

See also
List of lakes in Norway

References

Kvalsund
Lakes of Troms og Finnmark